Leopold Jansa (23 March 1795, Wildenschwert, far north-east Bohemia, Austrian Empire – 25 January 1875, Vienna) was a Bohemian violinist, composer, and teacher.

He was born in Wildenschwert, Austria-Hungary (present day Ústí nad Orlicí, Czech Republic) and died in Vienna. He took violin lessons as a child in his home town. He completed his education in Brünn. In 1817 he came to Vienna to study law. However, he soon took up composition lessons with Jan Václav Voříšek and Emanuel Förster.

He was a member of the Braunschweig orchestra in 1823, while in 1824 he joined the Vienna Court Orchestra. In 1834, he became music director and professor at University of Vienna. From 1834 to 1850, he participated in various String quartets. He took over from Ignaz Schuppanzigh, with Karl Holz (second violin) and Joseph Linke (cello) from the Schuppanzigh Quartet, adding Karl Traugott Queisser (viola). From 1845 to 1848 he directed quartet soirées at the hall of the Gesellschaft der Musikfreunde. In 1847-48 he taught violin at the Vienna Conservatory.

He lost his positions in Vienna as a result of his participation in a London concert in favour of the Hungarian Revolution of 1848. He stayed in London as a music teacher, until 1868 when he was amnestied and returned to Vienna. He resumed his previous duties in 1871.

Among his students was Wilma Neruda, later known as Lady Hallé, and Karl Goldmark.

He composed chamber music and violin works.

References 
 Biography from The Concise Grove Dictionary of Music.
 Biography from musiklexikon.ac.at

External links 
 

1795 births
1875 deaths
People from Ústí nad Orlicí
People from the Kingdom of Bohemia
19th-century Austrian people
19th-century Czech people
19th-century classical composers
19th-century classical violinists
Male classical violinists
Czech classical violinists
Austrian classical violinists
Czech male classical composers
Austrian male classical composers
Austrian classical composers
Czech Romantic composers
Czech music educators
Austrian music educators
Austrian people of Czech descent
Musicians from Vienna
19th-century Czech male musicians